The 2014 European Junior Judo Championships is an edition of the European Junior Judo Championships, organised by the European Judo Union.It was held in Bucharest, Romania from 19 to 21 September 2014. The final day of competition featured team events, with team Georgia winning the men's event and team Croatia the women's.

Medal summary

Medal table

Men's events

Women's events

Source Results

References

External links
 

 U21
European Junior Judo Championships
European Championships, U21
Judo
Judo competitions in Romania
Judo
Judo, World Championships U21